Haykavan or Haikavan or Aykavan may refer to:
 Haykavan, Armavir, Armenia
 Haykavan, Shirak, Armenia